Parriwi Head Light, also known as Rosherville Light and Port Jackson Entrance Range Rear Light, is an active lighthouse located just off Parriwi Road, near Rosherville Reserve on the south side of Middle Harbour in Mosman, New South Wales, Australia. It serves as the rear range light, Grotto Point Light serving as the front light, into Port Jackson. Grotto Point Light is located almost exactly  ( to be exact) in front of Parriwi Head Light.

It is one of four lighthouses in a style now sometimes called "Disney Castle", the others being Grotto Point Light, Vaucluse Bay Range Front Light and Vaucluse Bay Range Rear Light.

The light is shone through a horizontal slit just below the dome.

Site operation 
The light is operated by the Sydney Ports Corporation, while the site is managed by the Mosman Municipal Council as part of the Parriwi Lighthouse Park.

Visiting 
The site is open and accessible to the public, but the tower itself is closed.

See also 

 List of lighthouses in Australia

References

External links 
 
 
 Grant and Tracey's Lighthouse Pages – Rosherrville Light

Lighthouses completed in 1911
Lighthouses in Sydney
1911 establishments in Australia